"Fall of the Hulks" is a 2010 comic book crossover storyline published by Marvel Comics. It ran throughout the ongoing Hulk and Incredible Hulk series, as well as a self-titled limited series; featuring the Hulk and various members of his supporting cast.

Publication history
"Fall of the Hulks" was released between December 2009 and April 2010 by Marvel Comics. A hardcover collection of the issues was released on May 19, 2010.

The story details the supervillain cabal the Intelligencia's evil plot, and the reaction of the various Hulks and supporting characters. This story leads to the storyline called "World War Hulks".

Issues
As of March 2010, the following issues are announced as being part of Fall of the Hulks:

 Fall of the Hulks: Alpha
 Fall of the Hulks: Gamma
 Fall of the Hulks: Red Hulk #1-4
 Fall of the Hulks: The Savage She-Hulks #1-3
 Hulk #18-21
 Incredible Hulk #606-608
 Fall of the Hulks: M.O.D.O.K. #1

Plot synopsis
The storyline begins by revealing that MODOK is a part of a loose-knit cabal of scientists called Intelligencia (consisting of the Leader, Doctor Doom, Mad Thinker, Wizard, Egghead, and the Red Ghost). They have gathered the knowledge that MODOK eventually uses to create the Red Hulk. The group makes it explicitly clear that they are out to kidnap the world's eight smartest people. The Intelligencia's plan has yet to be revealed in its entirety but already has a wide influence on the Marvel Universe as a whole.

Red Hulk fights and kills General Thunderbolt Ross apparently at the behest of Bruce Banner, with whom he has formed an alliance. Betty Ross and Glenn Talbot (both thought to be dead) come to Ross' funeral. Lyra is later seen in the company of Red She-Hulk and MODOK and has joined their ranks for unknown reasons.

Red Hulk has been running missions in the alliance with Banner — including a trip to a secret A.I.M. base which houses not only cloned bodies of MODOK, but the Cosmic Hulk automaton as well. While trying to destroy the Cosmic Hulk, he accidentally powered it with a small charge of his own cosmic energies. The Cosmic Hulk made quick work of both A-Bomb and Red Hulk before being called off by the Leader. Red Hulk and Rick return to Banner, reporting on the events that occurred, and Red Hulk reveals to Bruce that Bruce has a daughter.

After telling him Lyra is Thundra's daughter, he remembers telling Thundra about Intelligencia and told her to accept their offer but to secretly be in contact with him. He recalls how she saved him from Samson and how they forced Wizard and his allies to stand back and how they went to Castle Doom to steal his time machine. In the present day after being attacked by vampire creatures in Castle Doom they teleport one day into the future and to the desert where Red Hulk hides the time machine and sends Thundra home after sharing a kiss with her. But he is being watched by A-Bomb.

He is then attacked by A-Bomb, who leaves having managed to obtain what he wanted to know: the agents that took him to an ambulance were not S.H.I.E.L.D. but A.I.M. working for The Leader and MODOK, how Red Hulk killed Abomination to get his blood, how Marlo was the one to release him from the base, and how a mental message was left in his mind by Doc Samson to kill Bruce Banner. It is then shown that Bruce Banner was the one who told him to attack Red Hulk and after a discussion of why he cannot change back to Rick Jones, the Red Hulk arrives in anger. However, he then revealed why he was attacked. They then trigger Rick's mental message by having Red Hulk beat Banner. Rick manages to overcome the message when Bruce tells him he is not angry for Rick's involvement in Bruce becoming the Hulk, and that it was not Rick's fault.

In a flashback, Red Hulk tells the Intelligencia that their plan will fail, which causes MODOK to attack him. Later, after their calculations end in Banner killing The Leader, they use the time machine of the desert to see a future that they control.

Lyra attacks her mother, Thundra, in the desert where her mother is searching for water. After revealing details about the future, Thundra fights back and beats her. Later, she is approached by Wizard, who was sent by the Intelligencia. They had watched her fight with her mother.  Lyra then battles him and the Frightful Four, her future team members, until Red She-Hulk arrives and beats her until Wizard stops her. Wizard and his allies leave, offering her a place on the team. She later accepts, but, once she has gained their trust, she searches for Jennifer Walters, eventually finding her in stasis.

Lyra, after having her intelligence increased four levels by Bruce Banner, releases Jennifer Walters and explains that she joined the ranks of the Intelligencia in order to find her. Bruce contacts Lyra through the remains of her technological watch, and tells her to wait for his strike on the base. Jennifer talks to Lyra about her childhood with Bruce and her origins, to which Lyra revealed in her time they believed she transformed in order to avenge her mother at the hands of male soldiers. Jennifer says it was told that way to give hope. Lyra then speaks of her confrontation with her mother and how she believes Thundra to be evil. They are then attacked by Red She-Hulk and afterwards Jennifer tries to convince her to join them, believing she was being manipulated by the Intelligencia; however, she throws them off the Hellicarrier base.

After assisting the Fantastic Four in defeating the Moloids in New York City, Skaar is proclaimed a hero and the city holds a parade in his honor. During the parade, Uatu the Watcher appears. Banner sees his supposedly deceased wife in the crowd. Convinced his wife has come back, Bruce teleports to speak to his secret partner, the Red Hulk, warning him that he had better not have had anything to do with his wife's return. The Red Hulk then proceeds to insult Banner, saying he hardly considers him a threat, baiting him and making him angry enough to begin his transformation into the Hulk, but Banner teleports away to Latveria near Doctor Doom's castle, supposedly to transform in private. Next, the Green Hulk smashes into Doctor Doom's castle and begins battling the Doctor. The two duel for a bit before Doom finally bests the Hulk with magic. Skaar (using Banner's teleporter) appears on the scene and takes on Doctor Doom, not to save his father, but to make sure he is the only one that will finally get to kill him. However, Doctor Doom quickly overwhelms him with spells and reverts Skaar to his 5-year-old non-powered form. Doctor Doom then explains that the "Hulk" he was fighting was actually a robot powered with cosmic energy (which Doctor Doom consumed to help defeat him and bolster his own power) sent by the Leader and taunts him that his "rescue" and approaching death at Doctor Doom's hands is all for nothing.

Just before Doom strikes the final blow, Banner teleports in and saves his son. Doctor Doom uses this opportunity to try to kill both of his now-vulnerable foes, but Banner disables his technology. Deciding to use his magic instead, Doctor Doom begins to succumb to a "poison pill" that was laced into the cosmic energy he absorbed from the Hulk robot, causing him to rapidly lose his intelligence and be unable to remember the spells he would need to kill them, or even how to use his armor. The Leader then reactivates the Hulk robot, who carries Doctor Doom off. Finally getting to meet his son in his mortal form and mind (Skaar's alter-ego is much like the Hulk's in that it is an alternate personality from his powered form) he tries to connect with him, but Skaar spurns his father's affection, stating that Banner cares for nothing other than getting his wife back, no matter the cost, and that Banner set up Skaar to find his teleportation tech to follow him to Latveria, regardless of what might happen to him or what danger he might have been in. He then reiterates his desire to someday kill him, whenever he finally transforms back into the Hulk. A flashback shows that Red She-Hulk prevents Jennifer Walters from escaping from A.I.M. custody. During this battle, Red She-Hulk brutally beats Jennifer and snaps her neck with a cable. In the last panel, Jennifer appears to be dead with the Red She-Hulk standing over her body.

Red Hulk travels to the Baxter Building to ensure that no casualties occurred during the Intelligencia's abduction of Reed Richards. Red Hulk battles the Thing, while trying to convince Grimm of his impending doom. Red Hulk finally convinces Ben that they need to reseal the Negative Zone portal into which the Trapster had knocked Ben. Red Hulk tries to absorb some of the negative energies to buy Ben some time, but the energies burn him and make him weaker. He loses his grip on the Thing, but saves him at the last minute. Meanwhile, Lyra takes her position in the Frightful Four (now consisting of her, Klaw, Wizard, and Trapster) to attack the Baxter Building following Thundra's betrayal. She is able to defeat the Human Torch on her own, although her clothes are burned off in the process. She takes a red Fantastic Four uniform and meets the Wizard. The mission is a success and Mister Fantastic is captured.

The two then head off to help the Avengers, who have been caught up in a struggle with the Red She-Hulk as she is attempting to abduct Henry Pym for the Intelligencia. Banner is attempting to rescue Pym from abduction, but Henry Pym has done a bit of research as the Scientist Supreme and can read Red Hulk's energy signature on Banner's cellular structure — proving that he and Red Hulk have met several times recently. Since Henry Pym doesn't trust Banner, he fights off his attempts to pull him out and goes toe-to-toe with the Red She-Hulk, who poisons him with another neural anesthetizer. Red She-Hulk has been ordered to bring Henry Pym in alive but the anesthetizer is killing him, so Banner convinces her to team up for a few minutes to help save Henry Pym. Banner tosses Amadeus Cho at War Machine in the chaos and Amadeus Cho hijacks his armor to create a defibrillator pulse, bringing Henry Pym back to stable condition. Henry Pym tries to turn into Giant Man but the anesthetizer forces him to shrink instead, giving Red She-Hulk the opportunity to grab him and teleport back to the Intelligencia, leaving only three more to capture, including Bruce Banner. After Pym's abduction, Banner meets with the New Avengers, demanding their cooperation with his plan, since they interrupted Pym's rescue and were responsible for his abduction. Banner is now the 'smartest good-guy on the planet.' Banner gets an Avengers quinjet and hand-picks a group composed of Korg, A-Bomb, Namor, Spider-Man, Wolverine and Amadeus Cho. He tells the group that he has chosen them because they all know what it is to lose someone they care about. Their mission is to rescue Reed Richards, Hank Pym, Hank McCoy, T'Challa and Betty Ross (who Bruce now reveals to the group as alive). His personal mission is to save Betty, no matter what the cost, and along the way, save the world from the Intelligencia.

While trying to save T'Challa from abduction by the Red Ghost and his Super Apes, Red Hulk is attacked by members of the X-Men (thinking he is the enemy), which thwarts his rescue attempt. Red Hulk gets some unexpected assistance from the Red Ghost's Super Apes before they are turned against him, too. He kills Mikhlo the Gorilla, enraging the Ghost who then crushes Red Hulk's heart. When he awakens later, he finds out that not only did the Red Ghost make off with T'Challa, but he managed to abduct Hank McCoy as well. Red Hulk returns to report in to Banner, and the two have a confrontation about Red Hulk's actions and attitude. Bruce Banner tries to convince him that the Intelligencia are playing him, making him act more like the old Green Hulk.

Bruce Banner and Red Hulk separately attack the Intelligencia's Helicarrier, while Amadeus is trying to take Betty from Talbot. During the battle, Banner and Skaar are attacked by Lyra. However, much to Skaar's shock, Banner is working with Lyra and launches her four levels up. Banner then informs Skaar that he has been using Skaar and the other heroes to save the day and his wife. Banner promises Skaar that he will get what he wants from him, which Skaar tells Banner is a lie. They are then attacked by Red She-Hulk and Skaar fights her while Banner releases the captured heroes. Skaar is wounded by Red She-Hulk but survives as Banner attacks her. Meanwhile, Amadeus Cho tries to get Betty from Talbot but she fights back, defending Talbot and rebukes Banner. Talbot puts Betty in a safe before he vanishes. Amadeus Cho then tries to free her while Banner defeats Red She-Hulk. Since Red Hulk has been used as power source, the Intelligencia plan is successful, transforming several heroes, soldiers and people in Washington into Hulks (including Amadeus Cho). An explosion occurs which launches Skaar from the Helicarrier, while Banner is defeated by the "Hulkified" heroes and put with the captured smart heroes, who are trapped in a fantasy world.

It is revealed that Banner and Red Hulk led them there. MODOK, Cosmic Hulk, and Mad Thinker's Gammadroid capture Red Hulk when he enters Intelligencia's Helicarrier. MODOK uses Red Hulk as part of a system to create a small army of Hulks, who are sent on a mission to take over the USA. In the process, several super-heroes are similarly exposed and turn into "Hulkified" versions of themselves. Deadpool is the first to be "Hulkified" when he successfully frees Red Hulk before they can completely drain him.

Collected editions

References

External links
 

Comics by Greg Pak
Comics by Jeph Loeb
Hulk (comics) titles